Samurai Jack, sometimes addressed as The Samurai or simply Jack, is a sobriquet adopted by the title character of the Cartoon Network/Adult Swim animated television series Samurai Jack (20012004; 2017). He was created by Genndy Tartakovsky and is voiced by Phil LaMarr. The character is introduced as a Japanese prince raised since youth as a samurai warrior, who trains under numerous teachers in a variety of skills in order to destroy the demon Aku with his divinely crafted sword.  Seconds before he can kill Aku, the demon sends him eons into the future, where Aku's future self rules all of Earth unopposed. Adopting the alias "Jack", the samurai makes it his mission to find a way back to his time and prevent Aku's post-apocalyptic dystopia.

Conception and character

Samurai Jack, as a character, was originally conceived by the series creator Genndy Tartakovsky. The basic premise of Samurai Jack comes from Tartakovsky's childhood fascination with samurai culture and the bushido code, as well as a recurring dream where he'd wander a post-apocalyptic Earth with a samurai sword and travel the world fighting mutants with his crush. The show is meant to evoke 1970s cinematography, as well as classic Hollywood films such as Ben-Hur, Lawrence of Arabia and Spartacus. Thematic and visual inspirations come from Frank Miller's comic book series Rōnin, including the premise of a master-less samurai warrior thrown into a dystopic future in order to battle a shape-shifting demon. Similarly, the episode "Jack and the Spartans" was specifically inspired by Miller's graphic novel 300 that retold the Battle of Thermopylae. Cartoon Network executive Mike Lazzo recalled Tartakovsky pitching him the series with Phil LaMarr as Jack as the main character: "He said, 'Hey, remember David Carradine in Kung Fu? Wasn't that cool?' and I was like, 'Yeah, that's really cool.' That was literally the pitch." Cartoon Network billed [Samurai Jack] as a series "that is cinematic in scope and that incorporates action, humor, and intricate artistry."

Storylines
After his father is captured and his homeland taken over by the demon lord Aku, the child who would become known as "Samurai Jack" was trained to be the ultimate samurai by teachers from various cultures around the world in order to wield his family's sword against Aku. After reuniting with his mother as an adult, he leaves to destroy Aku using his father's sword. Seconds before he can destroy Aku, the demon casts the samurai into the far future, in which Aku reigns supreme. Adopting a name for the first time, "Jack", Jack fights the forces of Aku for the following fifty years, as he attempts to both destroy Aku in the future and find his way back to the past to destroy Aku there.

The Premiere Movie

Part I: The Beginning 
Jack was born a prince to his father's empire, in an era greatly resembling Japan's Edo Period in appearance, albeit with culture closer to the Nara and Heian periods, shortly after Aku was sealed away by Jack's father. At the start of the series, when Jack is 8 years old,  a solar eclipse breaks the seal, freeing Aku, who abducts Jack's father. As was planned by his parents should Aku ever return, Jack's mother sends him to train around the world, and goes into hiding.

Jack's mother leaves him on a Japanese ship, where the captain teaches him astronomy and how to navigate via the stars. The ship takes Jack to Arabia, where a sheik teaches him to ride horses. From there, he is brought to Africa, where he learns to fight with pole weapons from a tribe of bushmen. After reaching proficiency, he travels to Egypt, where he is educated by their best scholars. Jack eventually moves to Greece and learns the art of wrestling, followed by a trip to England, where Robin Hood teaches him archery and how to hone his senses. He then travels on a Viking longboat working as a member of the crew. In Russia, he studies the art of axe-throwing from a boyar and later goes to Mongolia to learn combat on horseback. His final training takes him to a Shaolin monk temple, where he learns their discipline and Chinese martial arts.

After years of training with some of the greatest warriors of the time, Jack returns to the temple his mother is hiding in and is given the sword his father used to seal Aku along with his signature robe (referred to as a gi in-universe, although it more closely resembles a kimono and hakama combination traditionally worn by samurai). Jack travels to Aku's castle, finding his now-old father enslaved and very weak. He warns Jack that it is too early for him to fight Aku, but Jack ignores this warning and sets out to fight the demon. Jack severely wounds Aku, but before he can deal the final blow, Aku opens a time portal and throws Jack into it, sending him millennia into the future.

Part II: The Samurai Called Jack 
When Jack finally escapes the time portal, he lands in a technologically advanced city in a dystopian future. After Jack escapes being crushed, he meets three urban alien teenagers who call him "Jack". He learns from them that Aku has conquered the world and spread his influence across the galaxy, enslaving many planets while using Earth as his base of operations. The teens then suggest getting a drink at a nearby bar, where Jack disposes of alien criminals inside. This catches the attention of a group of anthropomorphic dog archaeologists, who discover the truth about Jack's origins and ask for his help in saving their group from Aku's oppression. Jack agrees and leaves with them, introducing himself as "Jack" for the first time. One of the bar's alien waitresses, secretly a spy for Aku, informs her master of Jack's actions at the bar. Jack and his companions arrive at the mines the dogs were excavating before witnessing the fate which befalls those incapable of fulfilling Aku's bidding.

Part III: The First Fight 

Jack and the dogs devise a strategy to defeat Aku's army of mechanical beetle drones. On the day of the attack, Jack faces the army and drastically reduces their numbers using the crystals Aku forced the dogs were to dig for, but runs out of artillery and is forced to fight the remaining drones on foot. Despite suffering several injuries, Jack finishes off the last drones when they attempt to retreat. With the army defeated, the dogs thank the Samurai and go their separate ways. Aku, who had been watching the battle the whole time, promises Jack that he will destroy him and that the time and place will be his choice.

Seasons 1–4
For most of the series, Jack embarks on adventures to a variety of environments as he searches for a way back in time or an opportunity to return home. During his fifty years in Aku's future, Jack spends much of his time helping people, garnering the respect of everyone he helps along the way, while Aku subsequently destroys nearly every method of returning to the past. Between seasons 4 and 5, Jack slowly falls into depression and madness due to his constant or seemingly irreversible failure to return home. Aku's time travel curse also renders Jack ageless.

Comic series

In February 2013, IDW Publishing announced a partnership with Cartoon Network to produce comics based on its properties. Samurai Jack was one of the titles announced to be published. It was further announced at WonderCon 2013 that the first issue of Samurai Jack would debut in October 2013, serving as a continuation from the fourth season of the series. The first comic in the series was released October 23, 2013. The final issue came out in May 2015. On October 25, 2016, IDW re-released all of the issues in a compilation entitled "Tales of a Wandering Warrior". Tartakovsky does not consider the comics part of the series canon. In 2017 and 2019, IDW Publishing published respective 5-issue and 4-issue miniseries, titled Quantum Jack and Lost Worlds, bridging the events of the fourth and fifth seasons.

Jack also appeared in multiple issues of DC Comics' anthology comic series Cartoon Network Action Pack, which ran from July 2006 to April 2012, as well as the crossover event Cartoon Network: Super Secret Crisis War!, which included characters from Ben 10: Omniverse, Dexter's Laboratory, The Powerpuff Girls, Ed, Edd n Eddy, Johnny Bravo, Cow and Chicken, Codename: Kids Next Door, Foster's Home for Imaginary Friends, and The Grim Adventures of Billy & Mandy.

Season 5

In Episode XCVIII, it is revealed that at some point, Jack lost his sword after Aku prevented him from using the final time portal, destroying the way home and mutating a trio of small, ram-like creatures that had been following the Samurai before escaping. Jack fought and killed the corrupted rams, only to have his sword fall into the pit where the time portal once stood, forcing him from then on to use futuristic technology such as firearms, explosives, and a heavily-armed motorbike. Despite becoming disillusioned and haunted by the past, Jack still continued his journey, with his tortured conscience as his only constant companion. During the course of 50 years, all the people or species Jack has helped, as well as other oppressed people on the Earth and across the galaxy, have begun openly rebelling against Aku's rule, inspired by Jack's nobility and bravery.

Episodes 1–5
In Episode XCII, he rescues a family from the Beetle Drones. While riding on his motorbike, he sees a plume of smoke in the distance but chooses to ignore it. When he stops for water, he sees extremely disturbing visions of his parents and his people asking why has he forsaken them, followed by a mysterious and ominous armored figure on horseback staring at him. This last apparition frightens Jack so much that he hastily departs on his bike. This happens again in the night, in which he sees a hellish vision of his father surrounded by flames, expressing his displeasure that Jack has forgotten his purpose, and Jack sees the rider once more. He then leaves the spot in fear. Jack finally arrives at the source of the smoke in a ruined city, and only sees death when he arrives.

He then runs into Scaramouche, who mocks him for his late appearance and the loss of his sword before attempting to tell Aku the news. Jack destroys his phone mid-call and proceeds to fight him. During the battle, he hallucinates again, this time seeing children and the armored rider. Eventually, he defeats Scaramouche, claiming the assassin's tuning fork sword, and proceeds to leave the area.

In Episode XCIII, he travels to a fork in the road and turns left. He stops to deal with a large Beetle Drone, which he easily destroys with his trident. After a while, the Daughters of Aku ambush Jack, destroy his equipment and damage his armor. He uses explosives to escape and hides within the Beetle Drone's husk. While hiding, he hallucinates a third time, this time seeing a vision of himself that tells him he should give up and join their ancestors since he has lost his sword. The hallucination urges Jack to honorably end his own life as there is no more honor in fighting and nothing can stop Aku now that his sword is gone. However, Jack refuses, believing he can still triumph as his foes are always just "nuts and bolts". He then proceeds to hide in a nearby temple, where the Daughters of Aku eventually find him. When one of the sisters manages to stab him in the stomach, Jack kills her, and is horrified to discover that he has killed a human being and not a machine. After recovering his stolen tuning fork sword, he destroys the temple and plunges into the river below to escape, passing out from blood loss. His unconscious body floats downstream, bleeding out in the river.

In Episode XCIV, a barely alive Jack continues to float downriver. After he manages to grab hold of a floating log, a frog hops on, warning him the Daughters are not far behind. Eventually, Jack reaches the shore and makes his way to a cave, being stalked all the while by the mysterious samurai. Inside the cave, Jack pulls the knife from his side with great discomfort before passing out again. Upon waking up, his hallucination of himself reappears and taunts him over his first human kill, coming to the conclusion that Jack wanted the Daughters to kill him, though Jack himself denies this.

The next morning, a blood-soaked Jack prepares to defend himself. Instead, an equally blood-soaked wolf enters the cave (the same wolf that appeared in the previous episode) and Jack passes out again. While unconscious, Jack remembers a time when his father defended their family from a band of outlaws who had ambushed their carriage. Waking up, Jack bonds with the wolf and nurses himself back to health. Remembering his father's lesson, Jack parts ways with the wolf and prepares himself for a rematch with the Daughters of Aku.

The Daughters soon track him down. Echoing his father's words, a hidden Jack offers the Daughters an ultimatum: Leave or face their destiny. The Daughters refuse and Jack, using the terrain and weather to his advantage, kills three of them, luring the final three to a fallen tree hanging over a cliff. Discarding his weapon, Jack sends two of the Daughters falling to their deaths before confronting the last one, Ashi. Ignoring her threats, Jack simply unwraps her chain from his wrist, and she falls to her apparent death. Unfortunately, the tree finally collapses from the struggle, sending Jack falling into the valley as well.

In Episode XCV, following a nightmare about the Daughterd, Jack wakes up in the snow, having survived the fall into the valley, and comes across Ashi's body, seemingly dead on impact. Jack hallucinates a murder of crows taunting him for killing real people, though he is quick to defend his actions, claiming the Daughters chose their path.

Unfortunately, Ashi also survived the fall; forced to fight her again, Jack defeats and restrains her. As a bound Ashi continues to badmouth him while swinging from a tree, Jack ponders her way of thinking and decides to try and convince her that he is not the enemy. Before he can do so, however, a giant monster emerges from the ground and swallows them both whole. Despite repeated attacks from Ashi, Jack manages to save her and break their fall, landing in the bowels of the beast. When they stop to rest, Ashi praises Aku and revels in her "victory", gloating that they are both trapped inside the monster and Jack will soon die as a result. Jack is more positive, however, having experience exploring the innards of large creatures, and determines that there must be another way out.

As Jack tries to explain that Aku is the true enemy, multiple blue-green creatures arrive and attempt to eat them, with Ashi kicking Jack towards the horde in another attempt to kill him. Using one of their severed appendages as a makeshift sword, Jack kills several of the creatures before rescuing an unhelpful Ashi, strapping her to his back and retreating deeper into the monster. While stopping to rest again, a small puff-ball creature appears before Jack and tries to convince him to escape without Ashi, believing she is only evil. Jack refuses to listen, but the creature's opinion is shared by Jack's self-hallucination. When Jack himself argues they are all in this predicament because of him, his hallucination reveals that Ashi has disappeared. Ignoring his past self and snapping off a makeshift mace from the monster's body, Jack kills the crab-like creature that abducted Ashi and brings her back, though she is (unsurprisingly) not grateful for the rescue. As Jack presses onward, Ashi continues to rant about his inevitable demise while singing Aku's praise.

Jack eventually becomes sick of her constant chatter, and once again tries and fails to reason with her before being forced to take shelter from a hail of needles. Eventually, after hiding from a centipede-like creature, Jack uses the pieces of its discarded exoskeleton to construct a makeshift set of armor, taking Ashi's disgust as a compliment. While climbing to a higher area, Jack determines a way out is close, prompting Ashi to send them both falling. Fortunately, Jack manages to grab a makeshift vine and save them both, but keeps Ashi on a longer leash for the rest of the climb. Finally, after reaching the top, Jack and Ashi spot an exit to the outside over a large pool of acid. As they hitch a ride on one of the flying creatures, a large, transparent fish-like predator spots them and gives chase. Using the other flyers to evade and hide, Jack and Ashi manage to reach the exit before it closes and escape from both monsters, landing in a surrounding ocean. Once outside, Jack rescues Ashi, then swims to a nearby desert island. As Jack harmlessly interacts with a ladybug native to the island, Ashi realises  that Jack is not her real enemy and begins warming up to him.

In Episode XCVI, Jack enlists the help of a sea serpent so he and Ashi can return to the mainland. Once ashore, Jack thanks the serpent for its assistance, then leaves Ashi behind. That night, however, following another brief hallucination from Jack's campfire, she appears before him, demanding he tell her the truth about Aku. Jack tells her she already knows the truth but ultimately relents due to her persistence, agreeing to show her more in the morning. Before they sleep, Ashi asks if Aku created the stars, and Jack responds by telling her his mother's story of how the Sun and Moon formed the heavens. The next morning, Jack shows Ashi solid evidence of Aku's atrocities, starting with the destroyed remnants of an entire forest, with only a single tree remaining as a reminder of the demon's might. After stealing fresh clothes from local vendors in a nearby city, Jack shows Ashi how Aku's regime provides asylum to intergalactic criminals, allowing them to ravage peaceful communities at their leisure. In another ruined city, Ashi finally sees the truth and resolves to help end Aku's tyranny.

However, Jack disagrees, claiming there is no way of stopping Aku without his sword, and thus, no hope. Suddenly, they find an injured blue humanoid in the rubble, who explains that all their children were captured and taken to a nearby factory. Jack and Ashi agree to help and infiltrate the facility. Discovering that the children are being mind-controlled by a high-pitched frequency, Jack keeps them occupied while Ashi searches for the source of the noise. Despite having his clothing torn to pieces and nearly being overwhelmed, Jack buys Ashi enough time to kill the factory's owner and destroy the control panel, freeing the children. Unfortunately, as the children's mind-controlling implants short-circuit and they fall unconscious, Jack cries out in anguish, believing them to be dead. At that moment, the mysterious rider appears before Jack, telling him it is time. Depressed from his perceived failure, Jack agrees and accompanies him out of the factory.

Episodes 6–10
By the time Ashi finds Jack in Episode XCVII, he is meditating in the middle of a cemetery, surrounded by the ghosts of other samurai and about to commit seppuku with help from the mysterious horseman. After Ashi reminds him there is always hope and informs him that the children they saved are alive, Jack finally overcomes his depression and intervenes before the Omen can finish Ashi, killing the apparition with the sword meant for his own disembowelment. Afterward, Jack thanks Ashi for her help, complimenting her hair and new dress, before resolving to find his father's sword.

In Episode XCVIII, Jack and Ashi return to the mountain where Jack lost his sword on the back of a large bird. After exploring the pit but finding no trace of his weapon, Jack comes to the conclusion that, after spilling innocent blood, the sword abandoned him, and not vice versa. While Ashi stays behind to protect him, Jack meditates onto another plane of existence to find his sword, eventually reaching a house in the middle of a vast ocean, where a monk invites him inside for tea. Jack prepares a cup of tea as best he can, but after tasting it, the monk informs him that the tea (and therefore Jack) is missing something: balance. As a consequence, the path to the sword remains blocked. Confused by the revelation, Jack begs the monk to show him the way, but the monk simply tells Jack he must do so on his own.

Unhappy with the result, Jack's dark side, Mad Jack appears one more time, angrily claiming the monk knows the location of the sword and is hiding it from them. Instead, Jack states he already knows where the sword is, opening his eyes to the truth and dispelling his dark side forever. The monk declares that Jack has found balance, and soon enough, Jack finds himself facing the deities Odin, Ra, and Vishnu. Like his father before him, they deem Jack worthy of the sword, returning the weapon and restoring his original appearance. Jack returns to Earth to find that Ashi has been fighting hard to protect him, remarking that she has been busy. With his confidence, gi, and katana returned, Jack states Aku is their next target.

In Episode XCIX, Jack and Ashi stop to rest in a city in the desert. Jack offers her some food from a local vendor, but she politely declines after it temporarily turns his head into a tropical fish. Soon, they board a large camel-like creature for transport across the desert, surrounded by several green anthropomorphic tigers, with Jack and Ashi acting awkward towards each other for most of the trip. Unfortunately, Jack quickly discovers that they have walked into a trap, forcing Ashi and himself to fight the tiger-men. After much fighting, the duo agrees it is time to leave, and continue their journey on foot. Eventually stopping at an oasis for water, Jack makes new straw hats for himself and Ashi while strengthening their relationship. Continuing on, Jack and Ashi take refuge from a sandstorm inside a strange, towering structure, discovering it is actually a prison ship, though the prisoners themselves are nowhere to be found.

Suddenly, Ashi is bitten and poisoned by a strange leech-like creature, but Jack manages to kill it and remove the poison from her leg before it can spread further. A loud, animal-like cry is then heard, forcing Jack and Ashi to retreat. Failing to find the way they came in, the two head deeper into the prison, ending up lost after finding it much bigger than imagined. Arriving at a larger prison cell, Jack and Ashi confront their pursuer: A massive alien monster made of the same leech-like creatures. Realizing they are vastly outnumbered, Jack cuts part of the ship with his sword, breaking a steam vent and buying them time to escape.

Soon, Jack and Ashi are directed to the ship's armory, where Jack receives a device that can kill the monster (dubbed Lazarus 92) that is hunting them. Unfortunately, he fails to learn the device's activation sequence due to a misfired laser gun from Ashi. In the ensuing battle, Jack and Ashi take turns trying to activate the device while fending off the monster. Ashi loses her clothing in the process, forcing an embarrassed Jack to lend her his gi, claiming she needs "protection". As they are overwhelmed, Jack finally manages to activate the device, killing Lazarus 92 with a massive electric charge. With the threat over, Jack and Ashi finally realize their feelings for each other and kiss.

Immediately after, in Episode C, Jack and Ashi quickly realize they are kissing and stop, nervous, and mildly disgusted from the venom. Ashi offers Jack his gi back, but he insists she keeps it until she finds new clothes, claiming the ship is drafty. Soon, they spot a hole in the ceiling leading outside. Ashi searches for something to wear while Jack heads back outside, finding a broken water pipe. After Ashi finds a sweater and boots in a locker room, she comes across Jack showering outside and kindly leaves him his gi. In private, however, Jack sees a bearded reflection of himself, warning him to be careful. Jack himself agrees since this has never happened to him before and wonders what to do. That evening, after hunting some worms for dinner, the two awkwardly try to make small talk. Ashi asks Jack if he ever thinks about his home, and Jack answers that he does so all the time, opening up to her with the memories of his home throughout the seasons.

When Ashi asks if there was a girl in his life, Jack explains that there was never time, since he was only 8 when Aku attacked his village. While Jack admits the time before Aku was nice, the memories of his home are the only way he will see it again. Before dawn, Jack leaves without Ashi and returns to the robot graveyard, only to find that the Guardian and his time portal have both been destroyed. Ashi soon confronts him, demanding to know why he left her behind. Jack explains that, in addition to witnessing the suffering of many innocent people, Aku has taken everything from him, leaving him with nothing but memories, and he does not want the same to happen to her. Instead, Ashi assures him they will defeat Aku together.

Sure enough, Aku himself appears before them, accompanied by Scaramouche. Aku claims he is aware that Jack lost his sword, having learned the information from Scaramouche. When Jack reveals the opposite, Aku telekinetically destroys Scaramouche's head in frustration. He casually prepares to leave as Jack attacks him, but smells something familiar nearby: himself. Jack is confused by this until Aku approaches Ashi. Smelling part of himself inside her, Aku remembers when he personally visited the members of the Cult of Aku, providing them with some of his essences.

He then deduces that the High Priestess drank his essence shortly after and gave birth to the Daughters of Aku, making Ashi his biological daughter. When Jack attacks him once again, Aku simply uses his essence inside Ashi to control her body like a puppet, forcing her to fight against Jack. Jack pleads with her to resist, but she is unable to do so, assuring her she is nothing like her father or mother. Unhappy with this, Aku throws a giant robot on top of them and tells Ashi she needs to "bring out her best" (i.e., himself), corrupting her with an upgraded version of her old outfit. Initially outclassed by her new agility and reflexes, Jack manages to break Ashi's sword and cut her arm, briefly getting through to her. Ashi begs Jack to kill her and stop Aku, but he stands down, unable to bring himself to harm her further. Before Ashi can finish Jack, Aku orders his daughter to stop, joyfully claiming the Samurai's sword as Jack kneels in defeat.

As Jack awaits his fate in Aku's Lair, he pleads with Ashi to resist her father's influence, though (on the surface) his cries fall on deaf ears. Fortunately, before she can kill him, Jack's allies arrive to save him, having watched his planned execution on TV. Seizing the opportunity, Jack breaks free and makes a run for his sword, only to be stopped by Ashi. Jack then meets up with his old friend, the now-elderly Scotsman, who tells him about his many daughters. Jack politely declines his friend's offer to choose one of them as his spouse, explaining that he already met Ashi.

Jack then attempts to free Ashi after being swallowed by her, finally doing so after confessing that he loves her. Aku then confronts Ashi, who declares that Aku is not her father. Ashi and Jack realize that she still has Aku's powers, and after a brief battle, she retrieves his sword and uses her power to create a time portal to return to the point where Aku first sent Jack to the future. Jack and Ashi then arrive out of the time portal, a few seconds after, to Aku's surprise. Jack then starts slashing Aku with his sword, trapping the demon around its blade. Jack then thrusts his sword into the ground and destroys Aku and his tower, escaping with Ashi. Sometime later, Jack and Ashi are about to be wed, but Ashi collapses at the altar, explaining that due to Aku's death in the past, she will have never have existed in the first place, before fading away.

Later, a grieving Jack mourns Ashi's passing in the forest. Seeing a ladybug and is reminded that the future will be bright now that Aku is gone. His hope renewed, Jack watches the sun shines over the forest, revealing its beauty.

Although in Samurai Jack: Battle Through Time, If the player defeats Aku after destroying all 50 Corrupted Emperor's Kamon medals, they will be treated to a unique scene similar to but separate from the original finale's conclusion. Rather than Ashi fading away and Jack standing alone (as the show had ended), Ashi and Jack are able to finally marry in his liberated homeland, happily embracing near fields and mountains of cherry-blossoms, Jack and Ashi are finally together in the final scene enjoying a future without Aku thanks to the time pocket copy of the future preventing Ashi's nonexistence.

Cultural impact

Critical reception
The depiction of Jack in the series' fifth season has been praised for its exploration of the hero's journey and the identity of the hero when their journey stagnates. Choice and lack of choice are explored: in Jack's introspections and actions; in the actions of Jack's enemies; in the contrast between humans who choose their actions and machines which are programmed; and in destiny and fate which offer no choice. Of the distinction and parallel between robots and humans, Tartakovsky said: "I wanted to show the human side that's been treated like a machine. Aku builds robots and all these robots are singularly programmed to kill Jack. What if it's humans? What if the one purpose in your whole life is to kill this one person and you're raised from birth that way?" Angelica Jade Bastién of New York magazine writes that there is a "distinctive undercurrent of loneliness stretching through the series from start to finish." Jack is often alone, dwarfed by the "grand solemnity of nature." He has lost his home and his relationship with his family, and in the final episode he loses his relationship with the woman he is about to marry.

Merchandise
Several toys and merchandise works of Samurai Jack have been released. A Funko Pop figurine of the character was announced on October 3, 2019. Hot Toys released a sixth scale action figure of Samurai Jack, and Hasbro released a six-inch action figure of the character as promotion for the series' fourth season.

References 

 
Animated characters introduced in 2001
Animated human characters
Cartoon mascots
Cartoon Network Studios superheroes
Characters created by Genndy Tartakovsky
Fantasy television characters
Fictional archers
Fictional attempted suicides
Fictional characters displaced in time
Fictional characters with immortality
Fictional characters with post-traumatic stress disorder
Fictional characters without a name
Fictional demon hunters
Fictional exiles
Fictional fugitives
Fictional gunfighters
Fictional guerrillas
Fictional hermits
Fictional hoboes
Fictional hybrid martial artists
Fictional Japanese people
Fictional kenjutsuka
Fictional kyūjutsuka
Fictional machine hunters
Fictional male martial artists
Fictional military strategists
Fictional monster hunters
Fictional ninja
Fictional Ninjutsu practitioners
Fictional nomads
Fictional orphans
Fictional princes
Fictional rebels
Fictional revolutionaries
Fictional samurai
Fictional Shaolin kung fu practitioners
Fictional swordfighters in television
Fictional vigilantes
Fictional war veterans
Fictional warriors
Japanese superheroes
Male characters in animated series
Male superheroes
Martial artist characters in television
Science fantasy characters
Science fiction television characters
Television characters introduced in 2001
Television superheroes
Time travelers